Haven Today is a national broadcast Christian radio program. Before 2000 the program was called The Haven of Rest. The radio program has been on the air since it was started in 1934 by Paul Myers. Paul Myers was an early 1930s radio manager and personality. Since 1934 the program has been heard by millions and has only had four hosts: Paul Myers (1896-1973), Paul Evans, Raymond C. Ortlund Sr., and Charles Morris.  The daily broadcast currently is on over 600 stations in North America and overseas.

History
Paul Myers was a 1930s broadcast radio host in Los Angeles. But Paul's life spun out of control due to alcoholism. He hit bottom. His wife locked him out of the house, but told him she would pray for him. As Myers began to read a Gideon Bible he found in his skid row hotel along San Diego’s waterfront, he found forgiveness, hope, and new life in the Lord Jesus Christ. With his new hope, he was back on the Los Angeles airways on KHJ (AM), and in 1934 started the radio broadcast The Haven of Rest. Paul Myers would host the on air program for 37 years. Paul Myers gave himself the name "First Mate Bob" and he was on the "Good Ship Grace".  He used a nautical theme for his program, which had teaching and singers. The program started with a ships’ air horn, then Eight Bells and a quartet of singer singing  “The Haven of Rest,” an 1890 song, by Henry L. Gilmour about a sinner anchoring his soul in Christ. Myers retired in 1971 and turned the program over to Pastor Paul Evans. Evans continued the tradition Myers had started till he stepped down in 1981. In 1979 Paul Evans wrote Divine Communication and in 1980 Divine Resources, both published by Haven of Rest. In 1988, the Haven of Rest was on 275 stations. In 1981, Dr. Raymond C. Ortlund Sr., the Senior Pastor at Lake Avenue Congregational Church in Pasadena, California, took over the program. Ortlund at the same time stepped down from pastorate at Lake Avenue. Raymond's Sunday morning services at Lake Avenue Congregational Church were broadcast over radio station KRLA. After 20 years at Lake Avenue Ray and wife Anne founded Renewal Ministries at about the same time he took over The Haven of Rest program. With Renewal Ministries they traveled around the world teaching about renewal and revival among God’s churches. Ray hosted the Haven of Rest radio broadcast with his distinctive voice for 19 years, from 1981 to 2000. Raymond C. Ortlund Sr. also served as a teaching pastor at Mariner's Church in Newport Beach, California in the 1980s. The National Religious Broadcasters Hall of Fame inducted Ray in 2008 for his years of hosting the Haven of Rest. Ray retired from The Haven of Rest in 2000. Charles Morris took over the program in 2000 and changed the program name to Haven Today. The in-house music quartet singers were replaced with contemporary Christian music in 2001. Charles Morris attended in seminary in Philadelphia. Charles was a news reporter and an editor for United Press International. Charles also worked as press secretary for two former U.S. Senators. For a time he owned and operated his own radio station. He worked with the late Dr. James Montgomery Boice before the Haven program. Charles has authored several books with his wife: Saving a Life, Jesus in the Midst of Success, and Missing Jesus.

Haven Quartet
The Haven of Rest Quartet began in 1934, the same time that the radio program started. Often called "the Crew of the Good Ship Grace," the quartet became very popular due to their clean vocal sound. The in-house singers used four-part harmony for the Haven of Rest radio broadcast ministry for 67 years. The quartet sang four to five songs live during each broadcast. Many traditional hymns and gospel songs were done a cappella and sometimes with an organ accompaniment. From 1934 until the 1950, all songs were done live on air. With the addition of their own ship-like recording studio and modern tape recorders in the 1950s, the quartet started to record their songs before the program for later playback.

In the 1980s, the group began to incorporate a more contemporary sound, but it still lagged behind the most popular trends in contemporary Christian and worship music. A name change to The Haven Quartet in 1989 failed to increase the group's recognition beyond its established audience. By 2003, the quartet was no longer an established part of the radio broadcast.

Members of the quartet since its inception included:

 Ernie Payne, bass singer (1934-1975)
 Lorin Whitney, organist (1934-1958)
 Bob Bowman, baritone (1934-)
 Charles Turner, second tenor (1934-)
 Kenneth Nelson, first tenor (1934-)
 Fred Lindblad (1934-1935, 1941)
 Clarence Soderberg (1936)
 Dean McNichols, organist (1958-1985)
 Glenn Shoemaker, bass singer (1975-1998)
 Herman Hosier, bass singer (1955-)
 Walt Harrah, tenor
 Randy Crenshaw, tenor
 Bill Cantos
 Jeff Gunn
 Truitt Ford, tenor
 Paul Sandberg, tenor
 Steve Ragsdale, baritone
 Dwayne Condon
Jim Bergthold, first tenor (1967-1977)
David Kleinsacker
Leonard Fox
Val Hellikson
Frank Alpers
Steve Lively
Scot Wojahn
Ron Mitchell
Gene Miller
Mike Redman

The quartet's discography included the following albums:

 Favorites (1961)
 His Name Is Wonderful (1962)
 Glory to His Name (1969)
 The Music of Haven of Rest: Collector's Edition (1978)
 We're Just the Singers of His Song (1979)
 Starboard (1983)
 Precious Memories: 50th Anniversary Album (1984)
 Tidings of Joy (1984)
 Awesome God (1989)
 Christmas with Haven (1989)
 With One Voice (1995)
 A Cappella
 An Acappella Christmas
 A Cappella Hymns
 Anchored
 Best of Christmas by Haven
 Best Of Vol 1
 Best Of Vol 2
 Be Ye Holy
 Come Let Us Adore Him
 Coming Home
 Crew of the Good Ship Grace
 Enter In
 Everything's Gonna Be Alright in Christ
 Haven of Rest
 The Hope
 The King Is Coming (This was a solo album by Jim Bergthold)
 Leavin' on My Mind
 Shipmates of Song
 So Many Ways To Praise
 Something To Sing About
 With One Voice
 Glory to His Name

Haven of Rest historical building
In 1941 Paul Myers had a nautical theme two story building built on 2432 Hyperion Avenue, Los Angeles in the Silver Lake District, near Hollywood for the Haven of Rest broadcast. On December 5, 2007 the building was awarded site number 895 on the Los Angeles Historic-Cultural Monuments list for its unique architecture. The building has porthole windows, gangway ramp and promenade deck hand rails. The studio had a pipe organ for the program. In 1998 the Haven program moved out of the nautical building to Costa Mesa, California and then move to Riverside, California. Before 1941 the program was done live in the KHJ AM. The program moved to a new station about every 2 years next was: KNX (AM), KHJ (AM), KMPC and then the KFI AM studio in Los Angeles. Then was picked up by the NBC Blue Network and NBC Red Network.

Currently
Charles Morris' Haven Today program is a mix of Christian music, biblical teachings, interviews and a discussion of current events. The program airs 5 days a week for a half hour. In addition to the radio program hosted by Charles Morris, Haven Today has a devotional guide called The Anchor daily started by Evans in the 1970s. The teaching is still based on "Jesus, because he is the one and only Haven of Rest".

Host

References

External links

Facebook Haven Today
The Haven of Rest - Early Film Footage on youtube
The Haven of Rest - How it began, interview on youtube

Evangelical parachurch organizations
American Christian radio programs
1935 radio programme debuts